Science Photo Library (registered as Science Photo Library Limited) is a privately owned stock photography and stock footage agency that specializes in scientific and medical images and videos. Its headquarters are in Maida Hill, in west London, U.K.

In addition to its commercial aims, Science Photo Library uses its media to sponsor and contribute to events aimed at popularising science to children, through educational multimedia competitions, and to the wider public through exhibitions such as From Earth to the Universe as part of the International Year of Astronomy, and its 2011 collaboration with RIA Novosti to showcase archive material covering the first human spaceflight by Yuri Gagarin.

References

External links
 Science Photo Library

Companies established in 1979
Companies based in the City of Westminster
Stock photography
Photo agencies